Pine Pond is a lake in Putnam County, in the U.S. state of New York.

Pine Pond was so named on account of pine timber at its perimeter.

References

Landforms of Putnam County, New York
Ponds of New York (state)